The canton of Cherbourg-en-Cotentin-3 (before March 2020: canton of Cherbourg-Octeville-3) is an administrative division of the Manche department, northwestern France. It was created at the French canton reorganisation which came into effect in March 2015. Its seat is in Cherbourg-en-Cotentin.

It consists of the following communes:

Cherbourg-en-Cotentin (partly)
Couville
Hardinvast
Martinvast
Nouainville
Saint-Martin-le-Gréard
Sideville
Teurthéville-Hague
Tollevast
Virandeville

References

Cherbourg-en-Cotentin-3
Cherbourg-en-Cotentin